Qadehar (also Romanized as Qādehār) is a village in Sarkhun Rural District, Qaleh Qazi District, Bandar Abbas County, Hormozgan Province, Iran. At the 2006 census, its population was 252, in 58 families.

References 

Populated places in Bandar Abbas County